George Andrew Tucker (December 10, 1927, in Palatka, Florida – October 10, 1965, in New York City) was an American jazz double-bassist.

Career
Tucker studied bass at the New York Conservatory of Modern Music in the late 1940s. Early in his career, he played with Earl Bostic, John Coltrane, and Jackie McLean. He worked in the house bands of several lauded New York jazz venues, such as the Continental Lounge, The Playhouse, and Minton's; he played with Eric Dolphy, Clifford Jordan, Horace Parlan, Booker Ervin, Jerome Richardson, and Junior Mance during this time. In 1958, he recorded with Melba Liston on her jazz classic, Melba Liston and Her 'Bones. In 1960–61 he recorded with Stanley Turrentine, Parlan, Ervin, Dexter Gordon, and Shirley Scott, and in 1962–63 he toured with the trio of Dave Lambert, John Hendricks and Yolande Bavan. Near the end of his life Tucker recorded with Coleman Hawkins and Jaki Byard.

George Tucker died from a cerebral hemorrhage while performing with guitarist Kenny Burrell.

Discography

As sideman
With Jaki Byard
Jaki Byard Quartet Live! (Prestige, 1965)
The Last from Lennie's (Prestige, 1965 [2003])
With Ted Curson
Ted Curson Plays Fire Down Below (Prestige, 1962)
With Walt Dickerson
To My Queen (New Jazz, 1962)
Walt Dickerson Plays Unity (Audio Fidelity, 1964)
With Eric Dolphy
Outward Bound (Prestige, 1960)
With Lou Donaldson
Midnight Sun (Blue Note, 1960)
With Booker Ervin
The Book Cooks (Bethlehem, 1960)
Cookin' (Savoy, 1960)
That's It! (Candid, 1961)
With Curtis Fuller
 Jazz ...It's Magic! (Regent, 1957)
Curtis Fuller Volume 3 (Blue Note, 1957)
Two Bones (Blue Note, 1958)
With Dexter Gordon
Doin' Allright (Blue Note, 1961)
With Bennie Green
Back on the Scene (Blue Note, 1958)
Walkin' & Talkin' (Blue Note, 1959)
With Slide Hampton
Slide Hampton and His Horn of Plenty (Strand, 1959)
With John Handy
In the Vernacular (Roulette, 1958)
With Willis Jackson
Neapolitan Nights (Prestige, 1962)
Boss Shoutin' (Prestige, 1964)
With Etta Jones
Love Shout (Prestige, 1963)
With Clifford Jordan
Cliff Craft (Blue Note, 1957)
With Lambert, Hendricks & Bavan
Havin' a Ball at the Village Gate (RCA, 1963)
At Newport '63 (RCA, 1963)
With Melba Liston
Melba Liston and Her 'Bones (MetroJazz, 1958)
With Gildo Mahones
I'm Shooting High (Prestige, 1963)
The Great Gildo (Prestige, 1964)
With Junior Mance
That's Where It Is! (Capitol, 1965)
With Charles McPherson
Con Alma! (Prestige, 1965)
With Jackie McLean
Fat Jazz (Jubilee, 1958)
With Oliver Nelson
Taking Care of Business (New Jazz, 1960)
With Horace Parlan
Us Three (Blue Note, 1960)
Speakin' My Piece (Blue Note, 1960)
Headin' South (Blue Note, 1960)
On the Spur of the Moment (Blue Note, 1961)
Up & Down (Blue Note, 1961)
With Dave Pike
Dave Pike Plays the Jazz Version of Oliver! (Moodsville, 1963)
With Pony Poindexter
Pony Poindexter Plays the Big Ones (New Jazz, 1963)
Gumbo! (Prestige, 1963) with Booker Ervin
With Sonny Red
The Mode (Jazzland (1961)
Images (Jazzland, 1961)
With Freddie Redd
San Francisco Suite (Riverside, 1957)
With Jerome Richardson
Roamin' with Richardson (New Jazz, 1959)
With Shirley Scott
The Shirley Scott Trio (Moodsville, 1960)
Satin Doll (Prestige, 1961 [1963])
Hip Twist (Prestige, 1961)
With Zoot Sims
Down Home (Bethlehem, 1960)
With Johnny "Hammond" Smith
All Soul (New Jazz, 1959)
That Good Feelin' (New Jazz, 1959)
Talk That Talk (New Jazz, 1960)
With Buddy Tate
Groovin' with Buddy Tate (Swingville, 1961)
With Lucky Thompson
Lucky Thompson Plays Happy Days Are Here Again (Prestige, 1965)
With Stanley Turrentine
Look Out! (Blue Note, 1960)
Comin' Your Way (Blue Note, 1961)
Up at "Minton's" (Blue Note, 1961)
Jubilee Shout!!! (Blue Note, 1961)
With Jimmy Witherspoon
Baby, Baby, Baby (Prestige, 1963)
With Jimmy Woods
Conflict (Contemporary, 1963)

References 

Works cited
Brenda Pennell, "George Tucker". The New Grove Dictionary of Jazz.

1927 births
1965 deaths
People from Palatka, Florida
American jazz double-bassists
Male double-bassists
Musicians from Florida
20th-century American musicians
20th-century double-bassists
20th-century American male musicians
American male jazz musicians